Blackhole are an English hardcore punk band from Hemel Hempstead and Berkhamsted, England. The band was formed in 2007 by singer Richard Carter and guitarist Andreas Yiasoumi when their previous bands fell apart. They have toured across the UK with Cancer Bats, Every Time I Die, The Ghost of a Thousand and Johnny Truant, along with others. They are currently signed to UK record label Search and Destroy. The band members are Max Hart on bass, Alex Hunt on drums, Nick Mitchell and Andreas Yiasoumi on guitar and Richard Carter on lead vocals. Richard Carter is the brother of Frank and Steph Carter from British hardcore punk band Gallows. It was announced on the band's Facebook page that they had parted ways in November 2010. In September 2015 the band announced via Facebook they would be reuniting to support Frank Carter & The Rattlesnakes on tour. A new album was announced in February 2016.

History
After forming in 2006, the band recorded a 4 track independent EP. However it was not until 2009 the band had a studio album released. After being picked up by the Search and Destroy record label, the band worked on recording new material. With the help of name producer Colin Richardson, who built upon the band's hardcore punk roots and added a hint of alternative rock influence to it, Dead Hearts was released on 7 September 2009. The band were chosen to play at the Sonisphere Festival in 2009 (only in the UK) on the Jägermeister stage, as well as headlining the Red Bull stage at that year's Download festival. Blackhole opening on a UK tour for melodic metalcore band Underoath, along with the British post-hardcore band We Are the Ocean during March 2010. Blackhole played at Slam Dunk Festival 2010 on the Imperial Clothing stage with Your Demise, Devilsoldhissoul and Azriel.

Members
Current
Richard Carter — lead vocals
Andreas Yiasoumi — guitar
Nick Mitchell — guitar
Max Hart — bass
 Jack Kenny — drums

Former
Alex Hunt — drums

Discography
Studio albums
Dead Hearts (2009)

Singles

References

External links
Blackhole at Discogs
Blackhole at MusicBrainz
BBC - Music - Review of Blackhole - Dead Hearts at BBC

British hardcore punk groups
Berkhamsted
Music in Hertfordshire